The 2023 UEFA Nations League Finals will be the final tournament of the 2022–23 edition of the UEFA Nations League, the third season of the international football competition involving the men's national teams of the 55 member associations of UEFA. The tournament will be held from 14 to 18 June 2023 in the Netherlands, and will be contested by the four group winners of Nations League A. The tournament will consist of two semi-finals, a third place play-off and final to determine the champions of the UEFA Nations League.

Following their win in 2021, defending champions France were unable to retain their title after finishing third in their group.

Format
The Nations League Finals will take place in June 2023 and will be contested by the four group winners of League A. The four teams were each drawn into a five-team group (rather than a six-team group) for the UEFA Euro 2024 qualifying group stage, thereby leaving the June 2023 window available for the Nations League Finals.

The Nations League Finals will take place over five days and be played in single-leg knockout matches, consisting of two semi-finals on 14 and 15 June (the first of which features the host team), and a third place play-off and final three days after the second semi-final on 18 June 2023. The semi-final pairings were determined by means of an open draw. All matches in the tournament will utilise the goal-line technology and video assistant referee (VAR) systems.

In the Nations League Finals, if the scores are level at the end of normal time:
In the semi-finals and final, 30 minutes of extra time will be played. If the score is still level after extra time, the winner will be determined by a penalty shoot-out.
In the third place play-off, extra time will not be played, and the winner will be determined by a penalty shoot-out.

Qualified teams
The four group winners of League A qualified for the Nations League Finals.

Host selection
The Netherlands was confirmed as the host country by the UEFA Executive Committee during their meeting on 29 November 2022. Only League A teams could bid for the Nations League Finals, and only one of the four participants is selected as hosts. UEFA requires the tournament to be played at two Category 4 stadiums, each with at least 30,000 net seating capacity. UEFA envisioned the larger of the stadiums to host the first semi-final (featuring the host team) and the final. The bidding timeline was as follows:

28 February 2022: Applications formally invited
13 April 2022, 16:00 CEST: Closing date for registering intention to bid (non-binding)
14 April 2022: Bid requirements made available to bidders
May 2022: Opening workshop for bidders
July/August 2022: Technical calls with bidders
7 September 2022, 16:00 CEST: Closing date for submission of preliminary bid dossier
5 October 2022, 16:00 CEST: Closing date for submission of final bid dossier
29 November 2022: Host appointment by the UEFA Executive Committee

On 13 April 2022, UEFA announced that Belgium, the Netherlands, Poland and Wales had declared interest in hosting the tournament. As all four associations form Group A4, the group winner is in line to be appointed as the host, provided that the associations submit bids which meet UEFA's requirements. Poland and Wales were unable to win Group A4 following their results on 14 June 2022, leaving Belgium and the Netherlands as potential hosts. On 25 September 2022, the Netherlands won Group A4 over Belgium and advanced to the Nations League Finals, thereby automatically winning hosting rights, which were confirmed by the UEFA Executive Committee on 29 November 2022.

Venues
De Kuip in Rotterdam and De Grolsch Veste in Enschede were confirmed as the venues for the tournament on 29 November 2022. Other potential stadiums, such as the Johan Cruyff Arena in Amsterdam (the largest in the country) and the Philips Stadion in Eindhoven, were both unavailable for the tournament due to previously scheduled concerts.

Draw
The semi-finals pairings were determined by means of an open draw on 25 January 2023, 11:00 CET, at the UEFA headquarters in Nyon, Switzerland. Former Dutch international Wesley Sneijder, ambassador for the Nations League Finals, drew the match pairings. The first two teams drawn were allocated to match pairing A, while the remaining two teams drawn were allocated to match pairing B. For scheduling purposes, the host team was allocated to the first semi-final as the administrative home team. The administrative home team for both the third place play-off and final were predetermined as the teams which advanced from semi-final 1.

Squads

Each national team has to submit a squad of 23 players, three of whom have to be goalkeepers, at least ten days before the opening match of the tournament. If a player becomes injured or ill severely enough to prevent his participation from the tournament before his team's first match, he will be replaced by another player.

Bracket

All times are local, CEST (UTC+2).

Semi-finals

Netherlands vs Croatia

Spain vs Italy

Third place play-off

Final

References

External links

 
Finals
2023
2022–23 in Dutch football
International association football competitions hosted by the Netherlands
June 2023 sports events in Europe
2022–23 in Croatian football
2022–23 in Italian football
2022–23 in Spanish football